Georgy Zakyrich (born 1884, date of death unknown) was a Russian fencer. He competed in the individual and team sabre events at the 1912 Summer Olympics.

References

1884 births
Year of death missing
Russian male fencers
Olympic fencers of Russia
Fencers at the 1912 Summer Olympics